Fears is a surname. Notable people with the surname include:

 Ivan Fears (born 1954), American football coach
 J. Rufus Fears (1945–2012), American historian, scholar, teacher and author
 Peggy Fears (1903–1994), American actress
 Shamari Fears (born 1980), American singer
 Tom Fears (1923–2000), American football wide receiver